Rhiostoma is a genus of operculate land snails in the subfamily Cyclophorinae of the family Cyclophoridae, native to parts of Asia. 

They are sometimes referred to as "snorkel snails" due to the tubular structure found on the final whorl of their shell, which resembles a snorkel.

Description
The shell is subdiscoidal with a broad umbilicus. The last whorl is separate from the rest of the shell and features a tube-like snorkel structure. The operculum is multispiral.

Etymology
The name is derived from "rhion" meaning a promontory and "stoma" meaning hole. In anatomy, a promontory is another word for a protuberance, so Rhiostoma can be understood to mean "protruding hole." This name refers to the snorkel on the shell which is the defining characteristic of the genus.

Ecology
Somwang Pathamakanthin of Thailand said about the ecology of Rhiostoma, "As we have kept some living animals of Rhiostoma species in our garden, we know that most of them burrow into the ground during the day and are active only when it is raining or-sometimes-during the night, when the temperature is lower and the humidity is higher. When it is extremely hot during the day, we observed that species of the large variety of Rhiostoma smithi (from the Chanthaburi province) preferred to move into water, where they stayed for days! Others have been resting under the shade of trees, under rocks and fallen wood. We have been informed that the bluish Rhiostoma from Songkhla province prefers to burrow into the soil underneath fallen wood or under stones close to the foot of limestone hills."

Taxonomy
Species within the genus Rhiostoma include 
 Rhiostoma abletti Thach, 2016 (taxon inquirendum, debated synonym)
 † Rhiostoma americanum G. D. Hanna, 1920 
 Rhiostoma asiphon Möllendorff, 1893
 Rhiostoma battambangense Thach & F. Huber, 2020
 Rhiostoma boxalli Godwin-Austen, 1893
 Rhiostoma cambodjense Morelet, 1875
 Rhiostoma chupingense Tomlin, 1938
 Rhiostoma dalyi Blanford, 1902
 Rhiostoma grohi Thach, 2020
 Rhiostoma hainesi Pfeiffer, 1862
 Rhiostoma haughtoni Benson, 1860
 Rhiostoma herosae Thach & F. Huber, 2017
 Rhiostoma housei (Haines, 1855)
 Rhiostoma huberi Thach, 2018
 Rhiostoma jalorense Sykes, 1903
 Rhiostoma jousseaumei de Morgan, 1885
 Rhiostoma macalpinewoodsi Laidlaw, 1939
 Rhiostoma marioni (Ancey, 1898)
 Rhiostoma morleti Dautzenberg & H. Fischer, 1906
 Rhiostoma ngocngai Thach & F. Huber, 2018
 Rhiostoma ngocthachi F. Huber, 2020
 Rhiostoma ninhbien D. S. Do, T. S. Nguyen & H. L. Do, 2020
 Rhiostoma samuiense
 Rhiostoma simplicilabre L. Pfeiffer, 1862
 Rhiostoma smithi Bartsch, 1932
 Rhiostoma strubelli Möllendorff, 1899
 Rhiostoma thachi F. Huber, 2018
 Rhiostoma thorsengi Thach, 2020
 Rhiostoma tomlini Salisbury, 1949
 Species brought into synonymy
 Rhiostoma americana G. D. Hanna, 1920 †: synonym of Rhiostoma americanum G. D. Hanna, 1920 † (wrong gender agreement of specific epithet)
 Rhiostoma battambangensis Thach & F. Huber, 2020: synonym of Rhiostoma battambangense Thach & F. Huber, 2020 (wrong gender agreement of specific epithet)
 Rhiostoma bernardii L. Pfeiffer, 1862: synonym of Opisthoporus bernardii (L. Pfeiffer, 1862) (original combination)
 Rhiostoma cavernae Godwin-Austen, 1889: synonym of Opisthoporus cavernae (Godwin-Austen, 1889) (original combination)
 Rhiostoma gwendolenae Godwin-Austen, 1889: synonym of Cyclotus gwendolenae (Godwin-Austen, 1889) (original combination)
 Rhiostoma hungerfordi Godwin-Austen, 1889: synonym of Cyclotus hungerfordi (Godwin-Austen, 1889) (original combination)
 Rhiostoma iris Godwin-Austen, 1889: synonym of Cyclotus iris (Godwin-Austen, 1889) (original combination)
 Rhiostoma macalpine-woodsi Laidlaw, 1939: synonym of Rhiostoma macalpinewoodsi Laidlaw, 1939 (hyphens are not accepted in specific epithet)
 Rhiostoma ninhbinhensis Thach & F. Huber, 2018: synonym of  Rhiostoma ninhbinhense Thach & F. Huber, 2018 (wrong gender agreement of specific epithet)
 Rhiostoma spelaeotes Tomlin, 1931: synonym of Pterocyclos spelaeotes (Tomlin, 1931) (original combination)
Taxa inquirenda
 Rhiostoma abletti Thach, 2016 (debated synonym)
 Rhiostoma christae Thach, 2016 (debated synonym)
 Rhiostoma ngocngai Thach & F. Huber, 2018 (debated synonym)
 Rhiostoma ninhbinhense Thach & F. Huber, 2018 (debated synonym

References

External links
 Kobelt W. (1902). Das Tierreich. Eine Zusammenstellung und Kennzeichnung der rezenten Tierformen. 16. Lieferung. Mollusca. Cyclophoridae. Das Tierreich. XXXIX + 662 pp., 1 map.

Cyclophoridae
Gastropod genera